Grand Trunk station is a train station located in Island Pond, Vermont. It was opened in 1853 by the Grand Trunk Railway and closed in 1965. The building has been converted to local use.

History 

Island Pond became an important railway center in 1853 when the Grand Trunk Railway formed international links between Montreal, Quebec, Canada, and Portland, Maine. The halfway point between Montreal and Portland was Island Pond, Vermont. This city became a thriving railroad center complete with a Roundhouse and all the equipment related to the operation of the trains. In 1923, the Grand Trunk Railroad became bankrupt and was taken over by the Government of the Canada which operated the railroad through its crown corporation, the Canadian National Railway. Since the Government of the Canada ran the railroad, political considerations soon outweighed the economy of the railroad; and trade was moved from the port of Portland, Maine to the Canadian ports of Halifax (Nova Scotia) and Saint John, New Brunswick.

The importance of the Portland line then began to decline and this would never be reversed. The importance of Island Pond as a major railroad town began to lose its importance towards the end of the 1950s, due to the elimination of steam locomotives. Around 1960, passenger service to Portland ended, and three years later, diesel locomotive repairs ceased. In 1966 the Rotunda was closed, and the staff working in Island Pond was reduced. The Canadian National continued to operate freight service to Portland until 1988; the following year, the line was sold to the St. Lawrence & Atlantic Railroad, which provides freight service to this day. The station building has been reutilized by a local bank and the town's historical society.

See also 

 Grand Trunk railway stations

References 

Railway stations in the United States opened in 1883
Former railway stations in Vermont
Island Pond, Vermont
Transportation buildings and structures in Essex County, Vermont